Tinitus was a metal show in Norway that was broadcast on Norwegian national radio, NRK P3 from 20:00 to 22:00 on Wednesday nights from 2005 to 2009. It showcased both Norwegian and international heavy metal talent and it was hosted by Kirsti Thisland Eggum and produced by Patrizia Pelgrift (nee' Mazzuoccolo).

External links
 Dagbladet Musikk
 Ballade.com:"Tinitus": Nytt metal-program på NRK
 Dagbladet Tvogmedier
 Metal Underground: Mastodon And Hatebreed Members To Be On Tinitus
 http://www.blabbermouth.net/ Tinitus NRK P3 

2005 radio programme debuts
NRK radio programs